Jennifer Jayne (14 November 1931 – 23 April 2006) was an English film and television actress born in Yorkshire to theatrical parents. Born Jennifer Jayne Jones, she adopted her stage name of Jennifer Jayne to avoid confusion with the Hollywood actress Jennifer Jones.

Career
Her film debut was a minor walk-on in Once a Jolly Swagman (1948), followed by The Blue Lamp (1949). Both of these starred Dirk Bogarde and she also appeared in the mystery The Black Widow, in 1951, with Anthony Forwood. After guest appearances in the television series The Adventures of Robin Hood (1955), The Adventures of Sir Lancelot (1956), and Sword of Freedom (1957), she was cast as the hero's wife in the next historical adventure series from the film-making division of Lew Grade's ATV, The Adventures of William Tell (1958).

She was a romantic lead in Raising the Wind (1961), set in a music academy and in Band of Thieves (1962), a musical comedy; she was also the leading lady in a Norman Wisdom vehicle, On the Beat (1962).

Under the pseudonym Jay Fairbank, she wrote the screenplays for Tales That Witness Madness (1973) and Son of Dracula (1974)

Personal life
She married art director Peter Mullins in 1958; they remained married until her death in 2006, aged 74.

Filmography

 Once a Jolly Swagman (1949) - Autograph Hunter (uncredited)
 Poet's Pub (1949) - Cyclist (uncredited)
 The Blue Lamp (1950) - June (uncredited)
 There Is Another Sun (1951) - Dora
 The Black Widow (1951) - Sheila Kemp
 It's a Grand Life (1953) - Pvt. Desmond
 A Yank in Ermine (1955) - Enid
 The End of the Line (1957) - Ann
 The Man Who Wouldn't Talk (1958) - (uncredited)
 A Woman of Mystery (1958) - Ruby Ames
 The Trollenberg Terror (released in the US as The Crawling Eye) (1958) - Sarah Pilgrim
 Mark of the Phoenix (1958) - Airline Ticket Clerk
 Dial 999 (TV series) - ('A Mined Area'; episode 21) (1959) - Louise
 Raising the Wind (1961) - Jill Clemons
 Band of Thieves (1962) - Anne
 On the Beat (1962) - Rosanna Guardia
 Clash by Night (1963) - Nita Lord
 Dr. Terror's House of Horrors (1965) - Nicolle Carroll (segment "Vampire")
 Hysteria (1965) - Gina McConnell
 The Liquidator (1965) - Janice Benedict
 They Came from Beyond Space (1967) - Lee Mason
 The Medusa Touch (1978) - Mother
 The Jigsaw Man (1983) - Nurse
 The Doctor and the Devils (1985) - Barmaid (final film role)

References
Notes

Bibliography

External links
 
 Aiming True - The Autobiography of Conrad Phillips Numerous mentions of Conrad Phillips and his relationship with his co-star, Jenny Jayne 

English film actresses
English television actresses
Actresses from Yorkshire
1931 births
2006 deaths